Brigadier General Kyai Hajji Syam'un (5 April 1894 – 28 February 1949) better known as Ki Syam'un was an Islamic scholar and fighter for Indonesian Independence. In 1916, Syam'un founded the Pesantren Al-Khairiyah, which in subsequent development became Al-Khairiyah Islamic College as an educational institution and organization. Syam'un received military education during the Japanese occupation of the Dutch East Indies and was later be appointed Battalion Commander (Daidancho) in the Pembela Tanah Air volunteer army. In 1945, he was appointed regent of Serang until his death in 1949.He was awarded the title National Hero of Indonesia in 2018.

Biography

Early life

Education

Notes

References

Footnotes

Bibliography

 
 
 
 
 
 

1894 births
1949 deaths
Al-Azhar University alumni
Indonesian collaborators with Imperial Japan
Members of Pembela Tanah Air
National Heroes of Indonesia
People from Serang Regency